The 1978 French Grand Prix was a Formula One motor race held at Paul Ricard on 2 July 1978. It was the ninth race of the 1978 World Championship of F1 Drivers and the 1978 International Cup for F1 Constructors. The 54-lap race was won by Mario Andretti, driving a Lotus-Ford, with teammate Ronnie Peterson second and James Hunt third in a McLaren-Ford.

Report
Following the voluntary withdrawal of the "fan car", Brabham had to revert to their previous car again, but it did not deter them, with John Watson on pole and Niki Lauda starting third behind Mario Andretti's Lotus. At the start, Watson led into the first corner, with Andretti following, and Patrick Tambay putting his McLaren in third, but that order did not remain for long as Andretti took the lead from Watson on the first lap. Lauda and Ronnie Peterson were on the move as well, as they passed Watson and Tambay to jump into second and third, but Lauda suffered another engine failure. This left the two Lotus cars running 1–2 and they finished like that with Andretti taking his third win in four races, and the podium was completed by James Hunt who passed Watson mid-race.

Classification

Qualifying

*Positions in red indicate entries that failed to qualify.

Race

Championship standings after the race 

Drivers' Championship standings

Constructors' Championship standings

References

French Grand Prix
French Grand Prix
1978 in French motorsport